English singer-songwriter Teddy Sinclair, previously known as Natalia Kills, has recorded songs for two studio albums and one extended play (EP), some of which were collaborations with other artists. She began her career as a recording artist by releasing the single "Don't Play Nice" on UK-based record label All Around the World Productions in 2005, under the name Verbalicious. Although the song peaked at number 11 on the UK Singles Chart, the label went bankrupt shortly after the track's release. Three years later, she co-wrote and provided vocals for "They Talk Shit About Me", a duet with French recording artist M. Pokora, as Verse. She also released an extended play entitled Womannequin to digital retailers, under Natalia Cappuccini.

In 2008, Sinclair started writing for other artists, under the alias Verbz. She also released a song named "Shopaholic", which was later remixed by Remix Artist Collective. American blogger Perez Hilton noticed that version and posted it online, which made her MySpace gain traction. Such attention prompted will.i.am Music Group to sign her in November, and Sinclair began recording material for a new album.

In March 2011, she released her debut studio album, Perfectionist, in which all tracks were co-composed by Sinclair. It peaked at number 129 on the UK Albums Chart, and entered the US Billboard 200 at number 134. During that year, she also collaborated with various recording artists, including The Knux, Far East Movement, and DJ Tatana. In the following year, she went to Los Angeles to work on her sophomore effort. Entitled Trouble, it was released in September 2013, and all its tracks had creative input from Sinclair and American record producer Jeff Bhasker. The album debuted at number 70 on the US Billboard 200, and spawned two singles, including "Problem" and "Saturday Night".

Songs

See also
 Natalia Keery-Fisher discography

References

Keery-Fisher, Natalia